A referendum was held on 4 April 1992 in the Australian state of Western Australia on the topic of introducing daylight saving. It was the third of four such proposals which have been put to Western Australian voters, and followed a trial over the 1991–1992 summer. The referendum failed to pass, with a majority of 53.14% voting against the proposal.

Referendum results 
Question: Are you in favour of the standard time in the State being advanced one hour from the last Sunday in October 1992 until the first Sunday in March 1993 and in similar fashion for each year thereafter?

References 

1992
1992 elections in Australia
1992 referendums
Daylight saving time in Australia
1990s in Western Australia
April 1992 events in Australia